The women's 400 metre freestyle event at the 2012 Summer Olympics took place on 29 July at the London Aquatics Centre in London, United Kingdom.

France's Camille Muffat held off a sprint duel from a hard-charging American Allison Schmitt with every stroke on the final stretch to capture the event's second Olympic title for her nation, since Laure Manaudou topped the podium in 2004. She maintained her powerful lead from the start to edge out Schmitt by 0.32 seconds for the gold medal and a new Olympic record in 4:01.45. Meanwhile, Schmitt could not catch Muffat on a head-to-head duel to finish with an American record of 4:01.77 in the process of winning silver. Great Britain's Rebecca Adlington struggled through the race in her Olympic title defense, but brought out a raucous cheer from the home crowd to earn the bronze in 4:03.01.

Denmark's Lotte Friis finished off the podium with a fourth-place time and a national record in 4:03.98, while Italy's Federica Pellegrini, the reigning world record holder, faded to fifth in 4:04.50. Muffat's teammate Coralie Balmy (4:05.95), Canada's Brittany MacLean (4:06.24) and New Zealand's Lauren Boyle (4:06.25) rounded out the field.

Records
Prior to this competition, the existing world and Olympic records were as follows.

The following records were established during the competition:

Results

Heats

Final

References

External links
NBC Olympics Coverage

Women's 00400 metre freestyle
2012 in women's swimming
Women's events at the 2012 Summer Olympics